The Eaton Baronetcy of Dunmoylin, County Limerick was created in the Baronetage of Ireland on 21 February 1682 for Simon Eaton.

Eaton baronets of Dunmoylin, County Limerick (1682)
Sir Simon Eaton, 1st Baronet (died 16 December 1697). His only son predeceased him and the Baronetcy became extinct on his death.

References

Eaton